The name Soudelor has been used to name three tropical cyclones in the northwestern Pacific Ocean. The name was contributed by the Federated States of Micronesia and is the name of a legendary chief of the ancient Saudeleur Dynasty in Pohnpei.

Typhoon Soudelor (2003) (T0306, 07W, Egay) – Category 4 typhoon that approached the Philippines, Taiwan, Japan and South Korea
Tropical Storm Soudelor (2009) (T0905, 05W, Gorio) – weak storm that struck southern China
Typhoon Soudelor (2015) (T1513, 13W, Hanna) – Category 5 super typhoon, had severe impacts in the Northern Mariana Islands, Taiwan, and eastern China

The name Soudelor was retired from the Western Pacific naming lists after the 2015 season and replaced with Saudel.

Pacific typhoon set index articles